The Broadcasting Organisation of Nigeria is an association that is in charge of private and public broadcasters in Nigeria. It is in charge of monitoring the activities, coordination and management of televisions, radio and all media broadcasts in Nigeria. It is located in Abuja, North-Central of Nigeria.

History 
BON was founded in 1973 with over 140 members and they collectively own 250 radio and Television stations. Mr. John Ugbe, representing MultiChoice Nigeria Limited, is the 14th and current Chairman of BON, while Dr. Mansur Liman, the Director General of the Federal Radio Corporation of Nigeria, is the current vice-chairman.

He took over from Hajia Sa'a Ibrahim, the first woman to be appointed as Chairman of BON since August 11, 1988. She was elected during the 72nd Annual general meeting. She is the Director-General of the Kano-based ARTV,

Vision 
BON is aimed at becoming the voice of Broadcasting industry in Nigeria.

BON is aimed at creating an enabling environment for radio, television and new media broadcasters to serve their audiences and to make a positive contribution to the development of our society

To improve the development of the broadcast industry in Nigeria while adopting cutting edge technologies to match their counterparts around the globe.

October 2021–present 
At the swearing-in ceremony in October 2021 at Abuja, the current Chairman of BON, Mr. John Ugbe, promised that his tenure would focus on training, aggressive membership drive, professionalism and related issues that will add value to the organization.

In line with his promise to improve professionalism among members through training, MultiChoice Nigeria hosted a 5-day intensive training on ‘Production for Television’ for BON members, facilitated by the MultiChoice Talent Factory in conjunction with Africa Magic. The training covered fundamental areas in TV production such as Multi-camera Directing, Studio Lighting, OB Van & External Broadcast, and a tour of the Studio for a well-rounded experience. The training had seasoned veterans in different areas of TV Production as facilitators: Mr. Jimi Odumosu and Mr. Bobby Heaney among others. The 5-day training is the first of a set that would also cover Radio Production and Transmission Engineering.

Aside from the training, the current leadership has promised to return the credible Broadcasting Organization of Nigeria’s award of excellence, leveraging on MultiChoice’s experience in organizing prestigious award ceremonies such as the Africa Magic Viewer's Choice Awards (AMVCA).

Activities and achievements 
BON organises free training on capacity building for its members and it purchased a property to serve as BON's Secretariat in 2018, after 46 years of operating in a rented apartment.

BON introduced the Broadcasters Hall of Fame to honour veteran broadcasters in the broadcasting industry

BON ensured that NBC's plan to shut down media houses over non-payment of fees was cancelled and BON was actively involved in the consideration of the digital switch-over during the Senate’s public hearing

List of BON Chairmen from 1988–present

Executive Secretaries of BON From 1991 to Date 

Dr. Yemisi Bamgbose is the 5th and current Executive Secretary of BON. He started his broadcasting career at Ogun State Television where he rose to the position of Assistant general manager. He was later transferred to the Ministry of Information as the Director of Information before he was appointed as Permanent Secretary. He retired from the service in 2018 and was appointed as the Executive Secretary, BON in June 2021 and assumed duties on July 1, 2021.

Dr. Bamgbose also served as the President of the Radio, television, Theatre and Arts Workers' Union (RATTAWU) between 2008 and 2015.

References

Mass media in Nigeria
Regulation in Nigeria
Professional associations based in Nigeria